The 1993 NBA Finals was the championship round of the 1992–93 NBA season, and the conclusion of the season's playoffs. It featured the two-time defending NBA champion and Eastern Conference champion Chicago Bulls, led by Michael Jordan, and the Western Conference playoff champion Phoenix Suns, winners of 62 games and led by regular season MVP Charles Barkley. The Bulls became the first team since the Boston Celtics of the 1960s to win three consecutive championship titles, clinching the "three-peat" with John Paxson's game-winning 3-pointer that gave them a 99–98 victory in Game 6.

Background

Chicago Bulls

With two consecutive NBA championships, the Bulls aimed at an elusive 'three-peat'. No team had won a third consecutive NBA title since the Boston Celtics achieved a run of eight titles in a row from 1959 to 1966.

In the offseason, Michael Jordan and Scottie Pippen played for the Dream Team at the 1992 Barcelona Olympics, winning the gold medal. They entered the new season with little rest, but it did not stop both Jordan and Pippen from leading the Bulls to a 57–25 record, good for second in the Eastern Conference.

Chicago began its push for a 'three-peat' with back-to-back sweeps of the Atlanta Hawks and Cleveland Cavaliers. But against the top-seeded New York Knicks, the Bulls fell behind 2–0, before winning the next two games in Chicago, tying the series. In a crucial Game 5 at Madison Square Garden, the Bulls stole a rare road victory, aided by an array of blocks on Charles Smith in the final seconds, before wrapping up the series in Game 6 at Chicago Stadium.

Phoenix Suns

The Suns were a team on the rise, led by their All-Star point guard Kevin Johnson. Johnson arrived via trade in 1988, and propelled the Suns to two consecutive trips to the conference finals in his first two full seasons.

In the 1992 offseason, the Suns made a blockbuster trade, acquiring Charles Barkley from the Philadelphia 76ers in exchange for Jeff Hornacek, Tim Perry and Andrew Lang. They also hired Paul Westphal as head coach, unveiled new logos and uniforms, and moved to the brand new America West Arena from the Arizona Veterans Memorial Coliseum.

The Suns made the most of these moves, winning a franchise record 62 games. Barkley's efforts won him the MVP award. However, in the first round of the Western Conference playoffs, the Suns fell down 2-0 to the Los Angeles Lakers, before rallying to defeat them in five games. In the second round the Suns defeated the San Antonio Spurs in six games, and were again pushed to a decisive game seven by the Seattle SuperSonics before ultimately winning the conference finals. For the Suns, it was their first NBA finals appearance since 1976 and second overall.

Road to the Finals

Regular season series
Both teams split the two meetings, each won by the road team:

Team rosters

Chicago Bulls

Phoenix Suns

Series summary

Game 1

Phoenix displayed an introduction animation in the vein of Chicago's well-known intro animation, set to the same song, before the game, which was remarked upon by the commentators. Before the game, a moment of silence was observed in memory of New Jersey Nets guard Dražen Petrović, who had been killed in a car accident two days earlier. The Bulls led the game from start to finish, and were able to quell several rallies from the Suns throughout.

Game 2

Both teams were locked in battle throughout the first half until Chicago took over in the 2nd quarter, shooting with a higher shooting percentage. In the second half, the Suns began to pressure the Bulls, but ran into trouble when Kevin Johnson fouled out, and Charles Barkley suffered an elbow injury. Late in the 4th quarter with time running out, it came down to a battle of determination. Scottie Pippen blocked Danny Ainge's 3-point attempt to seal the win and Phoenix became the first team to lose their home-court advantage twice in the first two games of the NBA Finals (the Orlando Magic did this two years later).

Game 3

The Phoenix Suns won Game 3 in triple overtime, 129–121. Suns Head Coach Paul Westphal became the only person to appear in two triple-overtime finals games: the first was the classic 1976 Game 5 contest against Boston as a player. His Suns also  became the only team to appear in two triple-overtime finals games, the first of which they lost 126–128. Westphal made a surprising move that paid off, helping to get Kevin Johnson back on track after Johnson had two terrible performances in Games 1 and 2, by having him guard Michael Jordan. KJ played much better all-around basketball for the rest of the Finals.

Suns: Kevin Johnson 25, Dan Majerle 28, Charles Barkley 24, Mark West 11, Richard Dumas 17, Danny Ainge 10, Tom Chambers 12, Oliver Miller 2, Frank Johnson 0, Jerrod Mustaf 0

Bulls: B. J. Armstrong 21, Michael Jordan 44, Scottie Pippen 26, Horace Grant 13, Bill Cartwright 8, Scott Williams 4, Trent Tucker 3, Stacey King 0, John Paxson 2, Darrell Walker 0

Game 4

In Game 4, Michael Jordan was unstoppable, scoring 55 points at Chicago Stadium and making a tough driving layup late in the game while getting fouled. The Bulls won 111–105. Scott Williams, who like MJ played his college basketball at UNC for Dean Smith, joked afterwards about "being proud that the two former Tar Heels combined for 57 points."

Suns: Charles Barkley 32, Dan Majerle 14, Kevin Johnson 19, Richard Dumas 17, Mark West 8, Tom Chambers 7, Danny Ainge 2, Oliver Miller 2, Frank Johnson 4

Bulls: Michael Jordan 55, Scottie Pippen 14, Horace Grant 17, B. J. Armstrong 11, Bill Cartwright 3, John Paxson 6, Scott Williams 2, Stacey King 3, Rodney McCray 0, Darrell Walker 0, Trent Tucker 0

Game 5

Before Game 5, Charles Barkley told the press he had announced to his teammates that they needed to win to "Save the City", a reference to the riots anticipated in Chicago if the Bulls won the championship at home. Both Paul Westphal and Kevin Johnson later expressed amusement about Barkley taking credit for the line because Westphal had made a tongue-in-cheek comment to that effect in a pregame meeting.

The Suns won 108–98 and headed home for Game 6 down 3–2.

Suns: Dan Majerle 11, Charles Barkley 24, Kevin Johnson 25, Mark West 5, Richard Dumas 25, Danny Ainge 8, Oliver Miller 8, Frank Johnson 2, Tom Chambers 0, Jerrod Mustaf 0 
 
Bulls: Michael Jordan 41, Scottie Pippen 22, Horace Grant 1, B. J. Armstrong 7, Bill Cartwright 2, John Paxson 12, Scott Williams 4, Stacey King 4, Will Perdue 0, Trent Tucker 5, Darrell Walker 0

Game 6

The Bulls got off to a good start in Game 6 but struggled in the fourth quarter, squandering a double-digit lead to trail 98–94. Michael Jordan made a layup to cut the lead to 2 points, and Dan Majerle's 30-foot three-pointer fell short on the Suns' next possession. Trailing 98–96 and playing a Game 7 on the road if they lost that day, Chicago ran a play that Phil Jackson called "Blind Pig" that had them increasing the play's "thrust" by bringing the ball from 3/4 back of the basket. Although Westphal's sole instruction on the play was for none of the players to double-team any of the Bulls (even Michael Jordan), Danny Ainge left John Paxson to try and either steal the ball or foul Horace Grant, who had missed all five of his shot attempts in the game and wasn't a good crunch-time free throw shooter. Grant saw Paxson alone 25 feet from the basket and fired a perfect pass, and Paxson then made a three pointer with 3.9 seconds left, giving the Bulls a 99–98 lead. Paxson's three-point field goal was the only score by any Bulls player other than Michael Jordan in the entire fourth quarter. The victory was secured by a last-second block from Grant on Kevin Johnson, thanks to Paxson's game-winning 3-point field goal.

Bulls: Michael Jordan 33, Scottie Pippen 23, B. J. Armstrong 18, Horace Grant 1, Bill Cartwright 2, John Paxson 8, Scott Williams 5, Trent Tucker 9, Stacey King 0

Suns: Dan Majerle 21, Kevin Johnson 19, Charles Barkley 21, Richard Dumas 8, Mark West 4, Tom Chambers 12, Danny Ainge 9, Oliver Miller 4, Frank Johnson 0

Michael Jordan, who averaged a Finals-record 41.0 PPG during the six-game series, became the first player in NBA history to win three straight Bill Russell NBA Finals Most Valuable Player Awards. He joined Magic Johnson as the only other player to win the award three times. The NBA started awarding the Finals MVP in 1969.

Player statistics

Chicago Bulls

|-
| align="left" |  || 6 || 6 || 41.8 || .508 || .526 || 1.000 || 1.8 || 5.0 || 0.8 || 0.2 || 13.5 
|-
| align="left" |  || 6 || 6 || 21.3 || .400 || .000 || .500 || 3.2 || 1.7 || 0.5 || 0.2 || 4.3 
|-
| align="left" |  || 6 || 6 || 38.8 || .528 || .000 || .579 || 10.3 || 2.3 || 1.5 || 1.5 || 11.2 
|-! style="background:#FDE910;"
| align="left" |  || 6 || 6 || 45.7 || .508 || .400 || .694 || 8.5 || 6.3 || 1.7 || 0.7 || 41.0 
|-
| align="left" |  || 6 || 0 || 8.2 || .273 || .000 || .875 || 1.3 || 0.5 || 0.3 || 0.2 || 2.2 
|-
| align="left" |  || 1 || 0 || 4.0 || .000 || .000 || .000 || 1.0 || 0.0 || 0.0 || 0.0 || 0.0 
|-
| align="left" |  || 6 || 0 || 16.0 || .619 || .643 || .000 || 1.5 || 0.8 || 0.5 || 0.2 || 5.8 
|-
| align="left" |  || 1 || 0 || 9.0 || .000 || .000 || .000 || 3.0 || 0.0 || 0.0 || 0.0 || 0.0 
|-
| align="left" |  || 6 || 6 || 44.3 || .439 || .000 || .543 || 9.2 || 7.7 || 2.0 || 1.0 || 21.2 
|-
| align="left" |  || 6 || 0 || 6.8 || .700 || .600 || .000 || 0.3 || 0.7 || 0.2 || 0.0 || 2.8 
|-
| align="left" |  || 3 || 0 || 1.7 || .000 || .000 || .000 || 0.0 || 0.3 || 0.0 || 0.0 || 0.0 
|-
| align="left" |  || 6 || 0 || 26.5 || .406 || .000 || .286 || 6.3 || 1.7 || 0.5 || 1.5 || 4.7 

Phoenix Suns

|-
| align="left" |  || 6 || 0 || 27.0 || .475 || .667 || .778 || 3.0 || 2.5 || 0.3 || 0.0 || 8.8 
|-
| align="left" |  || 6 || 6 || 46.2 || .476 || .250 || .750 || 13.0 || 5.5 || 1.2 || 0.5 || 27.3 
|-
| align="left" |  || 6 || 0 || 15.3 || .359 || .000 || .800 || 3.0 || 0.5 || 0.2 || 0.5 || 6.7 
|-
| align="left" |  || 6 || 6 || 26.7 || .571 || .000 || .778 || 4.3 || 1.0 || 1.3 || 1.0 || 15.8 
|-
| align="left" |  || 6 || 0 || 7.3 || .412 || .000 || 1.000 || 0.3 || 0.8 || 0.5 || 0.0 || 3.0 
|-
| align="left" |  || 6 || 6 || 43.3 || .421 || .000 || .920 || 3.0 || 6.5 || 1.3 || 0.3 || 17.2 
|-
| align="left" |  || 6 || 6 || 46.8 || .443 || .436 || .800 || 8.2 || 3.7 || 1.3 || 2.2 || 17.2 
|-
| align="left" |  || 6 || 0 || 17.8 || .444 || .000 || .750 || 4.2 || 1.3 || 0.7 || 2.0 || 5.0 
|-
| align="left" |  || 2 || 0 || 1.0 || .000 || .000 || .000 || 0.0 || 0.0 || 0.0 || 0.0 || 0.0 
|-
| align="left" |  || 6 || 6 || 21.7 || .619 || .000 || .533 || 4.3 || 0.7 || 0.0 || 1.2 || 5.7

Media coverage
This series was aired on NBC with Marv Albert, Bob Costas (hosts), Mike Fratello, Magic Johnson (who missed Game 6 due to attending his brother's wedding), Quinn Buckner (analysts), Ahmad Rashad (Bulls sideline) and Hannah Storm (Suns sideline) (reporters) calling the action. After the series, Johnson soon left NBC and returned to the Lakers for various roles, while Fratello was hired by the Cleveland Cavaliers as their head coach. Both were replaced by recently departed Orlando Magic head coach Matt Guokas. Albert and Fratello later reunited in 1999, this time calling NBA games on TNT, and would continue to do so for several more years.

The 1993 NBA championship documentary, Three-Peat, marked the first time since 1982 that NBA Entertainment used film in on-court or off-court action, although most of it used videotape. It was narrated by Hal Douglas, who narrated the NBA Championship documentaries of 1992, 1993, 1994, 1995, 1996 and 1997.

Aftermath
A month after the Bulls' third straight championship, Michael Jordan's father, James R. Jordan, Sr., was murdered. Distraught by the murder of his father, Jordan announced his retirement from basketball a few weeks before the 1993–94 NBA season began, citing a loss of desire to play basketball. Even without Jordan, the Bulls still managed to win 55 games behind the All-Star efforts of Scottie Pippen; however the loss of Jordan was steep to overcome, and following a controversial call that gave the New York Knicks a win in Game 5, the Bulls lost to Knicks in the conference semi-finals of the 1994 NBA Playoffs in Game 7. Jordan returned from retirement in March 1995, following a brief baseball career and made the 1995 NBA Playoffs, losing to the Orlando Magic in six games.

The Phoenix Suns finished with 56 wins in the 1993–94 season, but were eliminated from the playoffs by the Houston Rockets after leading 2–0 in the Western Conference semifinals. The following year, Phoenix took a commanding 3–1 lead against a sixth-Seeded Houston team only to lose again, losing Games 5 and 7 on their home court, the last of which was decided on a 3-pointer by Mario Elie and an ensuing free throw session. The Rockets went on to win both the 1994 and 1995 NBA Finals. In a last-ditch attempt to win a championship, Barkley was soon traded to the Rockets in 1996 for Sam Cassell, Robert Horry and Chucky Brown. Despite forming a "Big Three" with Clyde Drexler and Hakeem Olajuwon, the Rockets failed to make the NBA Finals in Barkley's four seasons. The 1993 Finals was the only appearance of Charles Barkley's Hall of Fame career. This would be the last Finals appearance for the Suns until 2021, which they would also lose in six games to the Milwaukee Bucks.

The 1993 NBA Finals marked the only instance in the "Big Four" professional sports in which a Chicago team defeated a Phoenix/Arizona team in a playoff series. In the 2007 National League Division Series, the Arizona Diamondbacks swept the Chicago Cubs 3–0, while in the 2012 Stanley Cup playoffs, the Phoenix Coyotes defeated the Chicago Blackhawks 4–2.

See also
1993 NBA Playoffs

References

External links
NBA History

National Basketball Association Finals
Finals
NBA
NBA
Basketball competitions in Phoenix, Arizona
1993 in sports in Arizona
1993 in sports in Illinois
1990s in Chicago
1993 in Illinois
20th century in Phoenix, Arizona
June 1993 sports events in the United States
Basketball competitions in Chicago
GMA Network television specials